The Êzîdxan Women's Units ( or YJÊ) is a Yazidi all-women militia formed in Iraq in 2015 to protect the Yazidi community in the wake of attacks by the Islamic State of Iraq and the Levant and other Islamist groups that view Yazidis as pagan infidels.

An offshoot of the mixed-gender Yazidi militia Sinjar Resistance Units (YBŞ), the YJÊ was founded on 5 January 2015 under the original name of Yekîneyên Parastina Jin ê Şengalê (YJŞ), or YPJ-Sinjar. The militia adopted its current name on 26 October 2015.

The organization follows imprisoned PKK leader Abdullah Öcalan's feminist Jineology, and with the broader concept of democratic confederalism as advocated by the Group of Communities in Kurdistan (KCK).

Activity
In October 2015, the YJÊ participated in the foundation of the Sinjar Alliance as an all-Yezidi joint commando umbrella structure, along with the Sinjar Resistance Units (YBŞ), the formerly Peshmerga-aligned Protection Force of Sinjar (HPŞ) and other, independent Yezidi units committed to the united Yezidi front.

Under the joint command of the newly founded Sinjar Alliance, the Êzidxan Women's Units took part in the November 2015 Sinjar offensive.

See also
 Genocide of Yazidis by ISIL
 List of armed groups in the Iraqi Civil War
 November 2015 Sinjar offensive
 List of Yazidi settlements

References

Apoist organizations in Iraq
Militias in Asia
Paramilitary forces of Iraq
Anti-ISIL factions in Iraq
Sinjar Alliance
Religious paramilitary organizations
All-female military units and formations
Feminism in the Middle East
Military units and formations established in 2015
2015 establishments in Iraq
Yazidi organizations in Iraq